Are You Smart Enough to Work at Google? (subtitled Trick Questions, Zen-Like Riddles, Insanely Difficult Puzzles, and Other Devious Interviewing Techniques) is a 2012 business book by Pulitzer Prize-nominated science writer, William Poundstone, describing details of the methods used and questions asked of job applicants to Google.

See also
Microsoft interview

References 

Business books
Little, Brown and Company books
2012 non-fiction books